The dozens of self-portraits by Rembrandt were an important part of his oeuvre. Rembrandt created approaching one hundred self-portraits including over forty paintings, thirty-one etchings and about seven drawings; some remain uncertain as to the identity of either the subject (mostly etchings) or the artist (mostly paintings), or the definition of a portrait.

This was an enormously high number for any artist up to that point, and around 10% of his oeuvre in both painting and etching.  By comparison, the highly prolific Rubens only produced seven self-portrait paintings.  The self-portraits create a visual diary of the artist over a span of forty years.  They were produced throughout his career at a fairly steady pace, but there is a gradual shift between etchings, more numerous until the 1630s, to paintings, which are more common thereafter.  However, there is a gap in paintings between 1645 and 1652.  The last three etchings date to 1648, c. 1651, and 1658, whereas he was still painting portraits in 1669, the year he died at the age of 63.

At one time about ninety paintings were counted as Rembrandt self-portraits, but it is now known that he had his students copy his own self-portraits as part of their training.  Modern scholarship, especially the Rembrandt Research Project, has reduced the autograph count to over forty paintings, as well as a few drawings and thirty-one etchings, which include many of the most remarkable images of the group. The etchings are mostly informal, often playful tronies, studies of extreme facial expressions or portraits in what amounts to fancy dress; in several the clothes are the fashions of a century or more earlier. In others he is pulling faces at himself. His oil paintings trace the progress from an uncertain young man, through the dapper and very successful portrait-painter of the 1630s, to the troubled but massively powerful portraits of his old age. Together they give a remarkably clear picture of the man, his appearance and his psychological make-up, as revealed by his richly weathered face.  To Kenneth Clark, Rembrandt is "with the possible exception of Van Gogh, the only artist who has made the self-portrait a major means of artistic self-expression, and he is absolutely the one who has turned self-portraiture into an autobiography."

While the popular interpretation is that these images represent a personal and introspective journey, it is also the case that they were painted to satisfy a market for self-portraits by prominent artists.  Both paintings and etchings seem to have often been bought by collectors, and while some of the etchings are very rare, others were printed in considerable numbers for the time.  No self-portraits were listed in the famous 1656 inventory, and only a handful of the paintings remained in the family after his death.

Rembrandt's self-portraits were created by the artist looking at himself in a mirror, and the paintings and drawings therefore reverse his actual features. In the etchings the printing process creates a reversed image, and the prints therefore show Rembrandt in the same orientation as he appeared to contemporaries.  This is one reason why the hands are usually omitted or "just cursorily described" in the paintings; they would be on the "wrong" side if painted from the mirror.  References to large mirrors occur at various points from the 1650s, and the later portraits include several showing him at a longer length than before; about 80 cm was the maximum height for a sheet of mirror glass technically possible in Rembrandt's lifetime. One may have been bought about 1652 and then sold in 1656 when he went bankrupt. In 1658 he asked his son Titus to arrange delivery of another one, which broke en route to his house.

Paintings

Etchings
Ernst van de Wetering divides the 31 etchings into categories; there "are perhaps only four that were considered by Rembrandt himself as 'official' self-portraits of himself intended for wider dissemination".  These are B7, B19, B21 and B22, stretching between 1631 and 1648.  There are a number (7 or 8) of what seem to be abandoned attempts at such portraits around the same times, some then used as etching "study sheets".  Then there are 10 "early studies in etching technique", most very rare, five "studies in expression", which he distinguishes from the three tronies, finished images using Rembrandt's own features in historical costume.

While the earliest etchings are very rare, many others that are not "official" portraits survive in large numbers, and certainly reached the market of collectors.  He notes that such aspects of the painted portraits as historical dress, poses recalling famous Renaissance portraits, a double portrait with Saskia, and portraits in his studio working clothes, are all seen in the etchings before they appear in painted self-portraits.  As noted above, there are only two sketchy etchings after 1648, and there are no etched equivalents of the great painted self-portraits of the 1650s and 1660s.

With Bartsch catalogue numbers.

Drawings
The number of drawings now accepted is far smaller, in single figures, and none of them seem to have functioned as preliminary studies for particular paintings or prints.  The standing portrait, if indeed by it is Rembrandt, may have been done for someone else's "friendship album" (album amicorum); keeping these was common in artistic and literary circles.  The Washington red chalk drawing, perhaps the most finished example, is close to the etching B2 in many ways; in both Rembrandt has a cadanette or long curling lock on one side.  Since these were "exclusive to aristocratic circles", it was probably invented like a piece of costume.

On screen 
A short film from 1956 by Bert Haanstra showed a chronological sequence of the paintings, with the eyes always in the same position, and the different images dissolving into each other.  There is also Le miroir des paradoxes. Autoportraits, film by Alain Jaubert from the Palettes series (1991).

See also
The Stoning of Saint Stephen, 1625, Museum of Fine Arts of Lyon, regarded as featuring Rembrandt's first self-portrait
'Tronie' of a Young Man with Gorget and Beret, Uffizi, Florence

Notes

References
Clark, Kenneth, An Introduction to Rembrandt, 1978, London, John Murray/Readers Union, 1978
"Printmaker": Hinterding, Eric, Luijten, Ger, Royalton-Kisch, Martin, Rembrandt the Printmaker, 2000, British Museum Press/Rijksmuseum, Amsterdam, 
 Schwartz, Gary, The Complete Etchings of Rembrandt, 1994, Dover, 
"Summary": Van de Wetering, Ernst, "Summary", A Corpus of Rembrandt Paintings, IV, 2005, Rembrandt Research Project, Dordrecht, PDF to download 
 Van de Wetering, Ernst, Rembrandt: The Painter at Work, Amsterdam University Press, 2000. 
White, Christopher, Buvelot, Quentin (eds), Rembrandt by himself, 1999, National Gallery, London/Mauritshuis, The Hague,

External links

Complete Rembrandt Catalogue: Self Portraits

 
Rembrandt
Prints by Rembrandt